Ramón Arsenio Benítez (born June 15, 1960 in San Martín, Buenos Aires) is a former Argentine football midfielder who played at club level in Argentina and Bolivia during the 1980s and 90's.

Benítez made his professional debut in 1981 for Gimnasia y Tiro de Salta. The following year he joined Central Norte, but shortly after he moved to Racing de Córdoba. His good form bought him a transfer to Instituto de Córdoba in 1983. During the mid 80's Benítez formed an impressive offensive partnership with Oscar Dertycia, Osvaldo Márquez and Enrique Nieto. He played at Instituto until 1988 making over 200 flight top appearances for the club. In 1988, he was transferred to Junior de Barranquilla, en Colombia. In 1989, he returned to Racing de Córdoba, and in 1990 the club suffered its relegation to the Argentine second division. Benítez played for Racing until 1992. Subsequently, he had a brief spell in the Liga de Fútbol Profesional Boliviano with Club Blooming. Later that year, he was signed by Talleres de Córdoba. Between 1992 and 1995 he played in 66 games and scored 5 goals in the Argentine Primera. The team was relegated but, gained promotion to the Primera with Talleres in the 1993-94 season. In 1995 Benítez transferred to Instituto, where he once played the best football of his career. In 1997 after 41 appearances and 2 goals scored for Instituto, he decided to retire from the sport at age 37.

External links
 Argentine Primera statistics at Futbolxxi.com  
 Profile at BDFA 

1960 births
Living people
Sportspeople from Buenos Aires Province
Argentine footballers
Association football midfielders
Racing de Córdoba footballers
Instituto footballers
Talleres de Córdoba footballers
Atlético Junior footballers
Club Blooming players
Argentine Primera División players
Primera Nacional players
Categoría Primera A players
Bolivian Primera División players
Expatriate footballers in Bolivia
Expatriate footballers in Colombia
Argentine expatriate footballers
Argentine expatriate sportspeople in Bolivia
Argentine expatriate sportspeople in Colombia